Richard Brennan may refer to:
Richard Brennan (barrister), Irish lawyer and officer in the Irish Defence Forces
Dick Brennan (journalist) (born 1969), American journalist
Rich Brennan (born 1972), American ice hockey player
Richard Brennan (filmmaker), producer of The Love Letters from Teralba Road
Richard Brennan (restaurateur) (1931–2015), New Orleans restaurateur, operated the Commander's Palace
Dick Brennan (hurler) (1885–1963), Irish hurler